Jeanvoinea is a genus of longhorn beetles of the subfamily Lamiinae, containing the following species:

 Jeanvoinea annulipes Pic, 1934
 Jeanvoinea borneensis Breuning, 1961

References

Lamiini